Milla Viljamaa (born 1980) is a Finnish musician and composer known for her creative works in various fields ranging from folk, tango and chamber music to theatre, opera, and film productions. She plays for example in the following ensembles: Duo Milla Viljamaa & Johanna Juhola, Las Chicas del Tango, Milla Viljamaa & Co, Johanna Juhola Reaktori and Hereä. She has also worked with larger groups like Australian Chamber Orchestra, Camerata Nordica, Saint Paul Chamber Orchestra, Irish Chamber Orchestra and Tapiola Sinfonietta.  In 2002 Duo Milla Viljamaa & Johanna Juhola won the 1st prize of the International Ástor Piazzolla Competition (Citta di Castelfidardo Award, Astor Piazzolla Music Section) and in 2008 received the Emma nomination for best ethnic music album. Viljamaa also teaches at the Sibelius-Academy Folk Music Department in Helsinki where she graduated with a master's degree majoring in piano and harmonium in 2007. She has also published new teaching material in form of a learning book and CD called "Folk Music for Pianists" in 2008.

Releases
Milla Viljamaa: Minne, A solo record with original music 2011
Johanna Juhola Reaktori: Tango Roto Live CD 2010
Milla Viljamaa: Paras aika päivästä (Best time of day) A solo record with original music 2008
Kansanmusiikkia pianisteille (Folk Music for Pianists) A sheet of music and CD 2008
Hereä: Hereä (Plastinka Records PLACD048) 2007
Duo Milla Viljamaa & Johanna Juhola: Mi Retorno CD (Texicalli Records TEXCD076) 2007
Las Chicas del Tango: La Voz Femenina CD (Texicalli Records TEXCD0079) 2007
Duo Milla Viljamaa & Johanna Juhola: Piazzolla Passage CD (Warner Music Finlandia Records) 2004

Selected Productions

Pohjan neidon tarina – A visual music tale, Musiikkiteateri Kapsäkki 2011
Valveunia – A staged concert composed by Duo Milla Viljamaa & Johanna Juhola, director Anni Ojanen 2010
Lumikki (Snow White) – The beloved story told in the language of dance, puppet theatre and music, director Elina Lajunen music by Milla Viljamaa 2010
Tango Roto – A modern Finnish tango show, director Minna Vainikainen 2009
Maria de Buenos Aires – A tango operita made by Astor Piazzolla and Horacio Ferrer, director Ville Saukkonen 2008
Kadonnut Kuu (Lost Moon) – A contemporary dance performance, choreographed by Jorma Uotinen, dancers Sirpa Suutari-Jääskö and Jukka Haapalainen 2008
Ansa (A Trap) – A visual concert with dance, circus and reacting video 2008
Kanteleen kyydissä (A Kantele Trip) – An interactive music story. Script and director Eppu Nuotio, music by Vilma Timonen 2008
Tummien perhosten koti (The Home of The dark Butterflies) – A movie by Dome Karukoski, music by Panu Aaltio 2008
Reverie – A new circus production, Med andra ord 2007
Kadonnut Kuu (Lost Moon) – An audiovisual concert with video art 2005
Bandu Bandu – A doctorate degree concert of Arnold Chiwalala 2002
Lumottu Saari (Enchanted Island) – A play with plenty of musicians, dancers and circus artists 2000

References

External links
Milla Viljamaa homepage
Milla Viljamaa at MySpace
Hereä homepage
Duo Milla Viljamaa & Johanna Juhola homepage
Las Chicas del Tango homepage

1980 births
Living people
Finnish composers
Finnish keyboardists
Nordic folk musicians